Caption may refer to:
Caption (text), explanatory text about specific published photos and articles
An element of comics where words appear in a separate box, see Glossary of comics terminology#Caption
Caption (comics convention), a small press and independent comic convention held annually in Oxford, England
Caption (law), arrest or apprehension
Closed captioning, used to provide the text of a show's audio portion to those who may have trouble hearing it
Subtitle (captioning), textual versions of the dialog in film and other visual media
Intertitle, a piece text edited into a film to convey information like dialogue
, an HTML element, see HTML element#caption